Lloyd Eugene Brown (May 10, 1933 – August 19, 1996) was a politician in the American state of Florida. He served in the Florida House of Representatives from 1972 to 1974, representing the 32nd district.

References

1933 births
1996 deaths
Members of the Florida House of Representatives
20th-century American politicians